Kashmiri cuisine is the cuisine of the Kashmir Valley in Jammu and Kashmir, India. Kashmiris have developed the art of cooking to a very high degree of sophistication and evolved a cuisine quite distinct from that of any part of the world. Rice is their staple food and has been so since ancient times. The equivalent for the phrase bread and butter in Kashmiri is haakh-batta (greens and rice). Meat along with rice, some vegetables and salad are prepared on special occasions like Eid. A typical everyday Kashmiri meal — lunch and dinner — consists of a generous serving of rice (about 250 gms), mutton (100 gms) and vegetables (about 100gms, mostly greens) cooked in oil, and yoghurt (50 to 250 gms).

Kashmiris consume meat voraciously. Kashmiri cuisine is of two distinct types — wazwan is the food of the Muslims, and the Pandits have their traditional batta. They share a love for lamb; the love a Kashmiri has for meat is unparalleled. They are, per capita, the highest mutton consumers in the subcontinent. According to official data, around 2.2 million sheep are slaughtered in Kashmir every year on an average adding up to 21,000 tonnes annual meat consumption in the region. Despite being Brahmin, most Kashmiri Pandits are meat eaters. The amount of mutton that is required to be bought for a Kashmiri Pandit wedding feast is 650 gm per head (not considering chicken). Kashmiri Muslims prefer goat, especially young, while Kashmiri Pandits choose lamb. Meat is called Neni by Pandits and Maaz by Muslims in Kashmir. In a majority of Kashmiri Pandit and Muslim cooking, bread is not part of the meal; it's always rice at lunch or dinner. Bread is only eaten with tea in the morning or evening.

The main daily staple food of the Muslims of Kashmir is plain cooked rice. They are typically not vegetarian, with very few exceptions. Meat stock is a salient ingredient even for so-called 'vegetarian' dishes. A joke shared is: Find me a Kashmiri vegetarian and I will give you a pot of gold.  However they often eat vegetable curries, with meat being an expensive indulgence. The cooking methods of vegetables, mutton, homemade cheese (paneer), and legumes are somewhat similar to those of Kashmiri Pandits, except in the use of onions, garlic and shallots by Muslims in place of asafoetida.

In Muslim cuisine, spices are less used as compared to that in Pandit dishes. Cockscomb flower, called "moaval" in Kashmiri, is boiled to prepare a red food colouring, as used in certain dishes. Pandits use the mildly pungent Kashmiri red chili powder as a spice, as well as to impart colour to certain dishes. Muslims use chilies in moderate quantity, and avoid hot dishes at large meals.

There is also a notable difference in the mode of service and eating between Pandits and Muslims, especially in the case of feasts. Amongst Muslims usually four persons eat together, in one big tinned copper platter, called a "traem" in Kashmiri; this is a round vessel of around  diameter, typically beautifully embossed.

History of Kashmiri cuisine 
From the mythical Mahabharata to the Iranian invasion of Kashmir (which was a part of Gandhara) by Darius in 516 BC, to the Mauryans who established Srinagara to the Gupta Empire to the invasion of Kashmir by Timur in 1398, the culture and cuisine of Kashmiris are linked to the greater Indian, Persian and Central Asian cuisines mixed with local innovations and availabilities of ingredients. The term kabab is Arabic in origin, korma has Turkish roots, and rogan josh, yakhaen, ab gosht, rista and goshtaba stem from Persian sources.

Early History
The process of Kashmir's amalgamation with outer world commenced with the importation of primitive forms of snake and fire worship from Iran. Since Paleolithic times, serpents were worshipped and buried with a supply of insects in their graves as a provision for their future life. In addition, they splashed grains at shrines and graves to express regard unto snakes and other animals.

The range of tools recovered at the Neolithic site of Burzahom, in the district of Srinagar shows the men were skilled hunters with knowledge of implements for cultivation. Stone hearths have been found at ground levels, near the mouth of pits. The Period II (Ceramic Neolithic) structures show a dish with a hollow stand and a globular pot. Rectangular harvesters with a curved cutting edge have also been recovered. Presence of harpoons indicates fishing. The art-producing behaviour of Neolithic men is witnessed in a hunting scene, with human, a dog and a sun path diagram.

Even before the Megalithic culture that followed the Neolithic period, there is evidence of wheat, barley and lentil cultivation. The presence of lentil explains that the people of Burzahom had wide contacts with Central Asia.

At the Gufkral Neolithic site 41 km southwest of Srinagar, archaeologists have confirmed settlers were engaged in wild game as well as domestication of animals. The animals that were known at the time were wild sheep, wild goat, wild cattle, red deer, wolf, Himalayan Ibex and bear. Roasting of food (both flesh and grain) was done only outside as no hearths or fireplaces were found inside the dwelling pits. Piercers were used for making incisions and for tearing open the flesh after the animal was killed and skinned, scrapers were used to scrape fat from the flesh. In the Phase IB of Neolithic occupation, some new additions included cattle and common peas. Pig (sus scrofa) and fish made their appearance in the late Neolithic period. Bones of hare (lepus), hedgehog, rodents and beaver were also recovered.

On the basis of the presence of the Emmer wheat (Triticumdicoccum) crop at Kanispur, seven kilometres east of Baramulla, contacts of Harappans with the Neolithic Kashmir has been suggested. With the Aryan migration to Kashmir around the 8th century BC, the fire worship cult got embedded into the innate religio-cultural texture of Kashmir through practices such as a phallic emblem of cooked rice. The local ceremony of vayuk is again near to the Iranian style of Farvadin. On a special day of the month, Kashmiri Muslims remember their dead, visit their graves and distribute loaves of rice.

Indo-Greek & Kushana period
Earthen thalis (pans) have been found at Semthan, north of Bijbehara from the Indo-Greek period (200 BC - 1st century AD). The Kushana history tells us that right from the days of the Kushana rulers (1st century AD - 450 AD) there were contacts between Romans and Kashmir. Kashmir was connected to the southern silk route via Gilgit and Yasin valley at Tashkurghan. The main items of export to Rome were saffron and dolomiaea costus (kutha). Dolomiaea costus was used in Rome for various purposes, among which for scenting of food and seasoning of wine.

Hindu dynasties
There were military contacts between the Karkota kingdom in Kashmir and the Tang (618 AD – 907 AD) court in China. When the Chinese Tang Dynasty successfully defeated the Tibetan forces and entered little Palur in October 722 AD, Kashmir was credited for providing agricultural supplies essential to sustaining the Chinese troops stationed in Gilgit valley.

Kashmir Sultanate (1346 - 1580s)
Since Islam did not directly arrive from Arabia to Kashmir, it naturally carried with it mixed Iranian and Central Asian influences. Hence, the rishi cult identified with Hinduism in subscribing to vegetarianism, non-injury to animals and abstaining from the use of garlic and onion in food. Nund Rishi, according to a legend, subsisted on a diet of dried dandelion leaves and Lal Ded preached and practiced strict vegetarianism.

Moreover, when Yusuf Shah Chak, the last independent ruler of Kashmir signed a treaty with emperor Akbar recognising his symbolic sovereignty in 1586 one of the terms was that the mint, the saffron and game would remain under imperial control.

Mughals (1580s - 1750s)
In 1635–36, during Shahjahan's reign, a violent conflict flared up between the Shias and Sunnis when a group of both the sections were eating mulberries at Maisuma and some were accused of using indecent words against Muhammad. In 1641, unprecedented floods followed by a famine rendered the villages desolate. Shahjahan sent 30,000 rupees to the subedar Tarbiyat Khan to be distributed among the destitute in Srinagar and also ordered that five centres should be opened in the valley to provide free food to the needy.

Foods mentioned in ancient Kashmiri texts
Foods mentioned in ancient Kashmiri scriptures/chronicles/travellers' accounts include:

 Rice, which could be imported from other countries in times of famine. Sultan Zain-ul-Abidin diverted the waters of the Dal Lake into the Mar canal which he extended up to Shadipur where it emptied itself at the confluence of Jhelum and Indus. Owing to these irrigation works, and reclamation of large areas for cultivation, Kashmir became self-sufficient in rice production. The natives considered the hot water at Dewsur sacred, and said that when one wished to know if any undertaking will prosper, they must take an earthen vessel, fill it with rice, and having secured the mouth, so that water may be excluded, throw it into the holy font. If on coming up the rice was boiled, it was deemed a fortunate omen, but unpropitious if otherwise.
 Pilau, yellow pilau, black pilau, shola pilau etc.
  Bikabatta. A dish consisting of rice, goat's fat and water.
  Rice mixed with sugar and sugarcane.
 Bread, it was not custom to eat naan until early 17th century.
 Milk, of cows and probably of buffaloes was consumed.
 Butter.
 Diverse Fruits, (Apple, Crabapple, Pear, Peach, Apricot, Cherry, Mulberry, Walnut, Melon, Water Melon, Greengage, Gooseberry, Currants, Raspberry, Strawberry, Sour Cherry).
 Musk-Melons, by the permission of Akbar, the crop was imported from Kashmir in the later season.
 Guavas, considered to be 'middling' by Jahangir.
 Diverse Vegetables, (Red Beet, Water Parsnips, Radishes)
 Utpalaska, Kashmiri wopal haakh.
  Rhubarb (pambahak), grew on the mountains surrounding Kashmir. Both Hindus and Muslims were fond of the stalks.
  Turnips, The turnips (gogjee) of Haripur were said to be the best in the valley.
 Kacchaguccha, modern kachdan.
  Sanda, Kashmiri haand.
  Carrots. The carrots (gazar) were eaten by the Muslim inhabitants but not by the Hindus.
  Leeks. Leeks (gaudapraan) were not eaten by the Hindus of the valley.
  Dimb. A vegetable found only in the Dal and Anchar lakes in Kashmir.
 Raw Flesh.
   Ram. Meat (mesa) was generally fried and sometimes highly spiced. The mutton of Nandipur was said to be the finest of Kashmir.
  Meat juice (mamsa rasa), said to cure bodily pain.
  Meat cooked in yoghurt.
  Ducks
  Pigeons.
  Beef, Kashmiri mystic Nund Reshi or Sheikh Noor ud-Din Wali expressed his disdain for a preacher who ate beef (moshi) and then complained it was the ogre's greed in one of his shruks. Sultan Ghiyas-ud-din Zain-ul-Abidin had banned cow slaughter in the state in deference to the religious sentiment of his Hindu subjects.
  Horse meat, was taken with relish in Kashmir.
  Pork, domestic pigs (gramya sukara) were eaten in Kashmir without any adverse notice in the 11th century AD.
  Poultry, the valley of Lolab was famous for the best quality of poultry. The practice of capon was known to the Kashmiris.
  Chicken Soup (shurba literally meaning saltish water, ba is the reverse of aab meaning water). Prostitutes consumed meat soup for removing the body ache caused by sexual intercourse with men.
  Other edible birds.
  Dog's flesh, cooked by people of Dom origin.
  Handu sheep, delicate and sweet in flavour and wholesome.
  Stags, chased down the Wular lake.
  Fish Soup, eaten to keep up aphrodisiacal vigour by men addicted to women. Ksemendra also stated that a prostitute regained youth by consuming fish soup.
  Trout
  Danube Salmon.
  Fowls (kukkuta). A favourite dish of the Kashmiris was to cook fowl and aubergines together.
 Honey.
  Boiled Eggs, the eggs were brought from Gilgit and Little Tibet (Ladakh) where they were procured in greater abundance.
  Pircham, an omelette-like preparation.
 Masura, a sort of lentil.
 Samudga, moong dal. Feeding only on rice and samudga was known to be miserly. Invariably, beggars and ordinary travellers received different sorts of rice and pulses as alms from different houses and had to eat them mixed up together.
 Kulattha, dolichos uniflorus.
 Chanah, horse gram.
 Other Pulses (including Peas and Broad Beans).
 Parpata or papara, modern papad. Another kind of food made from pulses.
 Ksira (kheer), rice boiled in milk.
 Ksirprakara, Ksirvata, Ksirayastika etc., sweet dishes prepared from milk.
  Machhama, a dish eaten by the Kashmiris consisting of rice, vegetables, raisins, colouring matter and sugar.
 Walnuts, which were eaten during famine as shali rice became dear.
 Pistachios.
 Sugar-cane., the country around Martand was planted with the crop.
 Grapes, grown only in Kashmir in India, according to Hiuen Tsang and which were rare even in Heaven, according to Kalhana. Of husaini and fakhri varieties from Khorasan.
  Unripe grapes (kur), the Kashmiris made excellent vinegar of it.
  Onions, it was supposed to be an expression of honour if onions were presented to teachers or elders. A soup prepared with fish and onions was a favourite in Kashmir.
  Garlic, several Brahmanas who used to eat it were expelled, according to Kalhana.
 Pomegranates.
 Holy Basil.
 Salt, a precious article and according to Ksemendra, consumed by the rich alone. Two varieties were found in the bazaars of Kashmir: rock salt from the Punjab, and powder salt, called bota nun from Ladakh.
 Saffron, historians suggest Persian saffron corms were transplanted to Kashmiri soil after Persia conquered Kashmir. The first harvest occurred sometime prior to 500 BC. Hiuen Tsang, a Chinese traveller in his Travels in India (631 AD) says that saffron flowers were long used to adorn the neck of oxen at the autumn festival in the country of Kashmir. Reference has been made of Kashmiri saffron in the Ratnavali of Harsha. Kashmiri poet Bilhana in his Vikramanka Charitam says that the cultivation of saffron flowers in Kashmir originated from Takshaka Naga, a holy spring. A popular myth talks about how when a naga chieftain (a water god) fell sick with an eye complaint, he was cured by the vaidya of Padmapur (Pampore). In gratitude, the naga gave him a bulb of saffron and thus the locals began the cultivation. Ksemendra mentioned that traders used to earn a lot through trade in saffron, in his 11th century satire Samayamatrka. In the Kaula tradition, a ceremony was performed with saffron for warriors. The Persian historian Firishta (1612) mentions that the saffron of Kashmir was particularly good. At the time of Jehangir (1605–27), the annual crop was 18.5 tonnes, more than anywhere in the world.
 Clarified Butter, lamps were prepared with ghee.
 Oil.
 Gold Dust.
 Curd.
 Half ripe Barley.
  Bread (apupa) and cake (pistaka) made from barley. A particular day of the year was observed as a festival, when barely became ripe in the fields.
  Spring Water, of Kokar Nag was said to appease hunger and renew appetite. A fountain in the neighbourhood of Achh Dal was scarcely equalled for its coldness, limpidity and refreshing qualities.
 Tea, came to Kashmir by caravans across Chinese Tartary and Tibet.
  Beer. For Kashmiri polymath Abhinavagupta, alcohol was the external essence of Shiva. Without alcohol, there was neither enjoyment nor liberation. The use of drink is admitted during the sautramani sacrifice of the brahmans, during a great battle in case of warriors, during farming in case of peasants, at great family celebrations, at the birth of a son, on the occasion of marriage or gathering of friends, and at the conclusion of the cremation ritual in case of slaves. For his commentator Jayaratha, the practitioner should drink because of a sort of bhairavic greatness, but not like a bonded animal, because of greed. The finest drink is on every occasion, the drink of average value is at the junctures, the worst is only once a month, and beyond a month he becomes a bonded animal.
  Wheat Beer.  Mead.
  Rum, from treacle.
 Wine, called mas in Kashmiri language. Kashmir was the only part of India where wine was made from the juice of the grape, a fact to be attributed rather to its acescent quality, than to any scarcity of fruit. For Abhinavagupta, alcohol which came from grape was splendour to a supreme degree. He praised the wine of his native Kashmir as mahabhairava (the mercurial essence). Jayaratha cautions against mixing it with any other ingredient, for the reason that its effectiveness would be quite limited. The popularity of wine in Kashmir is evident from the fact that on certain religious festivals like the new snowfall day, the second Mahimana and the Iramanjari-pujana the drinking of wine is recommended in the Nilamata Purana. It was enjoyed equally by members of both the sexes. At the beaded ring of a statue of goddess Lakshmi in a distinctively Gandharan style discovered by Frenchman Albert Foucher near the village of Brar in Bandipora in 1896, one can see clusters and foliage of vines. One Kashmiri king was so intoxicated with wine he told his ministers that if they wished to increase the beauty of his city, they should burn Pravarapura, the city built by king Sri Pravarasena of the Alchon Huns and his orders could not be disobeyed. Sikandar Butshikan, or the destroyer of idols (c.1416) prohibited vending wine in Kashmir.
 Maireya Wine, a spicy wine perfumed by camphor, and made out of fruits and flowers with a natural sugar base.
 Asava Wine, decocted extracts or cold infusion extracts of different herbs fermented with flowers of dhataki (woodfordia fruticosa).
 New Wine. The Hindus pressed the juice of the grape, strained it, placed it in the sun for four or five days and then drank it.
 Sweet wine, like Madeira. It would be found to improve greatly in quality with age.
 Fruit wine (madapan), made out of pears, apples or mulberry.
 Brandy, distilled from wine.
 Vinegar, Kashmiris made various pickles with it, the best of which was garlic, according to Jehangir.
 Flour cakes, fine flour could become expensive.
 Spirit from Grapes, liquor (mrdvika) was drunk with incantation and blessing.
  Spirit from Sugarcane.
 Sesame.
 Ginger., Jonaraja compares his words (as meagre) to water in dried ginger.
 Coarse sugar.
 Meat cakes.
 Fish.
 Dried food.
 Ira-flowers(drink).
 Green vegetables Betel leaves, taken along with the customary ingredients of lime, catechu and areca-nuts. Kalhana refers to a betel-leaf dealer who became an intimate of a king of Kashmir because of his supplying these to his court from far-off regions.

 Ingredients and seasoning 

Meat
Apart from chicken, fish and game, Kashmiris use only mutton (meat of mature sheep) or goat's meat. More than 75% of sheep population are cross breeds and are generally called Kashmir Merino that provides the dual purpose of meat and wool. Beef is consumed in towns and villages of Kashmir more so for its affordability. The biggest rabbit breeding farm in North India sprawls on six hectares of land in Wussan village of Baramulla district of Kashmir. The consumption of rabbit meat as a substitute for sheep and goat meat among the general masses is becoming popular. People with cardiac problems eat rabbits as the meat is considered lean and white with high nutritious value.

Cereals
People in Kashmir eat different varieties of rice including the nutty and fragrant Mushk Budji, grown in the higher reaches of the Kashmir valley.

Vegetables
The most important and frequently used Kashmiri eatables are: haakh (collard greens or kale), monj Haak (knol khol), tsochael(mallow), bamchoont (quince), kral mound (shepherds purse), saze posh (holly hock), nadur (lotus stem), praan (shallots), aubuj (sorrel), mawal (cockscomb), wushkofur (camphor), tila gogul (mustard) and gor (water-chestnut). The floating vegetable garden on the Dal Lake is the second largest wholesale market in the world. Men, young and old, on their wooden boats, argue about the price of plump pumpkins and gourds as they share cigarettes or hookahs. The water of Kashmir is sweeter, and that affects the taste and flavour of vegetables. The items for sale include tomatoes, carrots, cucumbers, turnips, water chestnuts, leafy vegetables, and the famous nadur. A porous and fibrous lake vegetable, nadur has grown to become an irreplaceable ingredient in a traditional Kashmiri kitchen. Local accounts date its discovery to the 15th-century sultan Zain-ul-Abidin, who was introduced to the chewy delicacy while on a shikara ride on the Gil Sar lake located in the exteriors of Srinagar. Also, according to a popular legend, the yarn threads that Lalla Ded (1320-1392), the Kashmiri mystic saint wove were thrown into the Dal Lake when her tyrant mother-in-law ridiculed and taunted her for yarning it too thin. These got changed into the fibres of nadur for eternity.

Sun-dried vegetables, locally known as hokh syun are consumed as fresh produce dwindles. During summer, vegetables are peeled, chopped, salted and sun-dried to preserve them for winter. The various varieties of hokh syun include dried tomatoes (ruwangun haech), dried bottle gourd (al haech), dried turnip slices (gogji haech), dried quince (bamchount haech) and dried spinach (hoech palak). In the Charar Sharief area of central Kashmir, dried pears, locally known as tang haech are considered a delicacy.

Snow Mountain garlic, also known as Kashmiri garlic, is a rare single-clove variety of Allium sativum. The clove beneath is bright white to creamy-white color and offers a strong, pungent garlic flavour without the acidity present in other varieties.

Sugar & sweeteners
Delicate nectar of the acacia flowers makes for honey in Tral, Verinag and other locations.

Fruits
Kashmiri apple is famous for its juiciness and distinct flavour as well. In 2019 alone, Kashmir produced over 1.9 million metric tonnes of apples, the highest among Indian states. Further, Kashmir accounts for 90% of India's walnut production. Kashmiri walnuts are a great source of nutrients and widely in demand across the globe. Many years ago, walnut oil used to be a medium of cooking and imparted a sweeter and nuttier flavour to dishes.

Muhammad Quli Afshar brought cherries from Kabul and planted them during Akbar's time. Mishri variety of cherry is famous in Kashmir and sweeter than other varieties. They are loaded with minerals, vitamins and plant compounds. The exotic berries from Kashmir are sweet and sour mulberry (tuell and shah-tuell), raspberry (chhanchh), barberry (kaawducchh) and red berry (haapat maewaa). Gassu area on the Srinagar outskirts is known for strawberry (istaber) harvesting.

Dairy Products
A traditionally ripened Himalayan cheese is called the milk chapati or maish krej in Kashmiri.

Spices
Kashmiri saffron is known for its aroma, colour, and medicinal value. The saffron of Pampore town is considered to be of superior quality with 8.72% crocin content as compared to the Iranian variety which contains 6.82%. In May 2020, Kashmiri saffron was given a geographical indication tag. The spice shahi zeera or imperial cumin or black cumin belongs to Apiaceae (parsley) family and was initially available in the jungles of Gurez Valley. These darker seeds unlike the regular brown zeera are of superior quality because of their smell, relative rarity and shape.

Among the spices used:

  Kashmiri chilli pepper (martswangun) — chilies are grown locally in Kashmir. When they turn red, they are dried and ground into powder form. Powdered red chilies are moderately hot coloring agents that are used for most meat and some vegetarian dishes.
  asafoetida (yangu) — used in much of Kashmiri Pandit cuisine, both vegetarian and non-vegetarian.
  cardamom (nich auleh) — the seeds, derived after crushing the pods, can be used in curries such as yakhean, qaliya, and also in teas such as kahwah and sheer/noon chai.
  bay leaf (tej pata) — most commonly used for rice polav and biryani dishes in Kashmir.
  black pepper (marts) — both fruit and seed are used.
  cinnamon (dalcyn) — typically used in most of the dishes in Kashmir and is also an important ingredient in kahwah chai.
  cloves (rong) — an essential ingredient in many dishes such as rogan josh, dum olav and is also used in making pickles.
  fennel (bodiyana) — often used in making breads such as kulcha and is served by itself after food. Ground aniseed is used in almost all Kashmiri stews.
  ginger (shaunth) — in its dried, powdered form, it is used in almost all Kashmiri cuisine.
  tamarind (tambar)
  turmeric powder (lader) — among the most widely used spice in Indian cooking and in Kashmiri cuisine in particular. It imparts a yellow color to curries but should never be substituted for saffron for this purpose because the two have little in common.
  saffron (kong posh) — a pinch of the crumpled stigmas is enough to give the color and bittersweet taste to a dish.
  cumin seeds (safed ziur) — an important spice for almost all dishes, vegetarian or non-vegetarian, except bhat haakh.
  caraway seeds (krihun ziur/zureh)
  coriander seeds (danival) — in Kashmir, it is used in dried form as well as whole seed. It is essential for making pickles and vari (Kashmiri Garam Masala).
  nigella seeds (siyah dana)
  fenugreek seeds (bresta) — used for fish dishes, making vari, and for making pickles.
  dry fenugreek leaves (hoechh mith)
  nutmeg (zafal)
  mace (jalvatier)
  soda bi-carb (phul)
  shelled seeds of cucumber, musk melon, water melon and pumpkin (char magz)
  dry crushed mint leaves (hoekh pudana)
  dry garlic (rohan)
  dry shallots (pran)
  vari masala cakes — a quick flavouring agent for many dishes such as haakh, gogjee nadur, spinach, kohlrabi, razmah gogjee, fish and shikaar (game).
  silver leaf (varak) — tissue-thin edible silver sheets used for garnishing pulao and meat dishes.

Rock salt consumption is quite old in Kashmir. It was and is still being imported from Khewrah area of Pakistani Punjab, where it was first discovered by the troops of Alexander the Great in 326 B.C. Pre-independence, rock salt was imported via Mughal Road, which, before the advent of Mughals, was called Namak Route. After partition, its supply was barred. Because of its benefits, it is now being consumed by almost one-fourth of the population.

Specialties by season

Spring is often considered a season of rejuvenation after a long and harsh winter. Picnics, of which the Kashmiris are very fond, are planned around the theme of food. The countryside is awash with white and pink flowers of almond (badaam), peach (tsunun) and cherry (gilaas) blossoms. The mustard fields join the show with their bright-yellow blooms. The pear (tang) blossoms can be identified by their thick cluster of flowers. Apricot (Tser) blossoms are white in colour, often tinged with a pink or reddish hue. They grow from late spring through early summer. Beans are a spring vegetable. Cherries are a fruit of late spring and summer. Coriander (Danival) is a cool herb whose season predominates between spring and summer in cooler areas. Garlic (Rohan) is found mainly in spring and through fall season. Melons (Kharbooz) are a fruit grown in spring and summer. Tender spring-time haakh (collard greens) are called kaanul.

The season of harvesting lotus stem (nadur) starts in September. With the onset of autumn the markets are filled with the dried vegetables (hokh syun). Rice harvest begins setting off the harud (autumn) spirit. Going to the countryside, one can see paddy being cut with sickles and then stacked in huge piles to dry. Chestnuts are roasted in the dying embers. Saffron fields in full bloom greet you in Pampore, a part of Pulwama district. Going towards the hilly areas one can see the maize and walnut trees with their fruit getting ready to be harvested. Going towards the apple producing areas of Sopore in North Kashmir or Shopian in South Kashmir, one can see cartons of apple being transported to various parts of the country.

During the long winters the days are short, sunlight and electricity in short supply, so there is not much that can liven up existence except interesting food, so it constitutes a major interest of the Kashmiris' lives. When all village roads remained blocked due to heavy snowfall and villagers have to use oil lamps or kerosene lanterns, the entire family is called to the kitchen where flavour of the overnight shab deg fills the entire space. Winter food of Kashmir includes all sorts of pulses: razmah, mong, masoor, channa and warimuth. Kohlrabi (monje) is cold tolerant, and continues to grow on the fields in winter, so much that a little frost even helps it.

List of Dishes

Some noted Kashmiri dishes include:

Barbecue

One version of the origin of kababs is the one in which Turkish soldiers were first known to grill chunks of meat on open fires. Kashmir's kababs are cooked with local spices and accompanied with dips:

 Kabab, condimented minced meat, roasted or fried, on skewers. According to chef Ghulam Nabi Dar (aka Bitte Waaze), the meat for the kabab is first minced with a very sharp knife (haché au couteau), then it requires an egg, cumin, cardamom and garlic, then it needs to be minced some more until it becomes a paste, then it is mounted on 1 m long skewers to be reheated the day after.
  Kokur Kabab, chicken kebab.
 Lahradar Kabab, also known as Lahabi/Moachi kabab. Minced mutton classically shaped like a boat with a depression in the centre, cooked in curd based mild spicy gravy. Once softened, the meat is soaked overnight in egg and at least nine different seasonings and spices, including onions, red chili powder, nutmeg, garam masala, ginger, garlic and coriander. It is typically served with yoghurt.
  Kokur Lahabdar Kabab Ruwangan, chicken kebabs in rich tomato gravy.
 Shammi Kabab, wazwan style mutton patties with ground chickpeas, egg and mild Kashmiri spices.
  Champ, lamb chops.
  Nadur Maund, Kashmir's answer to hash browns, lotus root ginger and mint patties with a dash of eclectic Kashmiri spices.
  Buzith Tschaman, grilled paneer, it is said a poet wandering in the lovely forests of Kashmir, cooked this dish out in the open.
  Buzith Hedar, nicely marinated grilled mushrooms.
  Buzith Gaad, charcoal grilled fish marinated with Kashmiri spices.
  Buzith Olav, Thool, Maaz etc., the round oven-baked clay-pot kangir works as an oven for baking food-items such as eggs, potatoes, pea beans, chunks of meat etc.
  Talith Gaad, fish marinated in black pepper, cumin and Kashmiri chilli and then shallow-fried.
  Gaad Talith Ta Badaam, fried fish with almonds.
  Talith Kokur, Fried chicken.
 Chicken/Mutton/Beef Tujji, meat marinated in Kashmiri red chillies and aniseed powder, barbequed to perfection. The steel rods called seekh are held over an iron grill and roasted over red-hot embers called baath-e-czini. Served with chutney, over special Kashmiri bread called lavas.
  Gaad Tujji, fish kababs.
  Tschaman Tujji, Kashmiri style marinated cottage cheese chunks barbecued on a skewer and served with a side of chutney.
  Tchaap Maaz, sausages.
  Kaleeng, thick membrane that covers sheep's head,skull and all, chopped coarsely and set to cook with spices and minimal liquid over a low fire for hours.

Breakfast

For the average Kashmiri, breakfast normally means fresh bread from the local bakery and a cup of noon chai (salt tea). Some affordable luxuries include:

 Harisa is a popular meat preparation made for breakfast, it is slow cooked with spices in a special underground oven for a 24-hour period and hand stirred. A good harisa entails a meticulous mincing of deboned mutton, mixed with local rice, fennel seeds, cinnamon, cardamom and salt. The dish is so tasty that one 18th century Afghan governor, who came here during the Afghan Rule, is believed to have over-eaten himself to death.
 Harisa Zafrani, sprinkled with Kashmiri saffron. A maker in Aali Kadal was known for this peculiar dish.
 Luchi & Halwa, by luchi makers outside Kheer Bhawani shrine.
 Makai Vath, cooked granular maize meal. Used to be a staple food in the unirrigated highland villages, where rice could not be grown.
  Gaer Vugra, water chestnut flour porridge. These water chestnuts or buffalo nuts are called gaer in Kashmiri. They grow in shallow waters at many places, especially near the shore of the famous Wular lake. In India, these water chestnuts also grow but are generally bigger in size and have more water content. Generally eaten with churned yoghurt diluted with water (gurus).
  Vushki Vath, barley meal porridge. Cooked as a staple food in some hilly villages of Kashmir, where rice or maize is not easily available or grown.

Wazwan Dishes

Unlike most dishes of the Indian subcontinent where the flavour is added to the food while cooking on the flames, the wazwan flavours are added while the dish is still uncooked by adding flavoured water to the preparation or soaking in flavoured water (osmosis):

 Tabakhmaaz, rib racks in ghee with sweet fat lodged between lacquered slips of meat Kashmiri Hindus commonly refer to this dish as Qabargah. While Qabargah is simmered on a low heat for a longer duration and then fried very quickly, Tabakhmaaz is boiled with salt and garlic and characterised by a slightly elastic texture.
  Tang ta Lahabi Kabab, whole Kashmiri pears & mutton kababs that often go with a tomato-yoghurt gravy.
 Waaza Kokur, whole chicken cooked in saffron gravy with mild Kashmiri spices.
  Safed Kokur, chicken with white sauce.
  Dani Phoul, mutton shank.
  Aab Gosh, also known as Dodhe Maaz. A famous milk-based curry cooked in spices and ghee over a low flame. Ten litres of pure cow milk is reduced to one and then mixed with the mutton.
  Methi Maaz, mutton intestines flavoured with a spice mixture containing dried fenugreek (methi) leaves.
  Waazeh Hedar, Kashmiri wazwan-style mushrooms.
  Marchwangan Kormeh, meat cooked with spices and yogurt and mostly using Kashmiri red chillies and hot in taste.
  Kokur Marchawangan Kormeh, Chicken cooked in red hot chilly gravy.
  Aloobukhar Kormeh, mince cooked with dried plums.
  Badam Kormeh, tender mutton pieces cooked in creamy almond gravy.
  Danival Kormeh lamb cooked with coriander or parsley.
 Kokur Danival Kormeh, chicken cooked in curd based gravy, flavoured with saffron and fresh coriander.
  Monje Kael, knol-khol prepared in onion gravy.

Soups

Soups are often given to new mothers:

  Tsatt/Maaz Rass, mutton stock with mutton pieces flavoured with aromatic spices and salt.
  Kokur Poot Rass, Kashmiri chicken soup with garlic and pepper.
  Channa Rass, easy chickpea soup for days when you don't really feel like cooking but want something healthy on the table quickly.

Domestic Meat Stews

  Qaliya, a mutton delicacy in which all flavours are included, excluding red chilly powder. It is prepared in Kashmir, especially on shishur, a ceremony held in honor of a new bride or newborn baby at the onset of winter in December.
  Kokur Qaliya, chicken qaliya.
 Shab Deg: dish cooked with turnip and meat/duck/chicken/beef and balls of ground meat, left to simmer overnight.
  Dani, marrow-bone in gravy.
  Matschgand, lamb meatballs in a gravy tempered with red chillies.
  Methi Matsch, muttonballs with fenugreek leaves that have been boiled, crushed or liquidized into a paste.
  Matsch Ta Tser, lamb fingers with apricot. The dish looks beautiful when laid on the table as the apricots remain yellow and the minced meat read making it very colourful.
  Olav Bokhara Barith Matsch, minced meat balls stuffed with plums.
  Mith Ta Golemach, minced meat balls with fenugreek.
  Matsch Ta Phul Gupi, minced lamb fingers with cauliflower.
  Matsch Ta Olav, lamb fingers cooked with potatoes.
  Tser Kofta, minced mutton balls with an apricot inside.
  Nadir Ta Maaz, lotus stems and mutton.
  Nadir, Oluv Ta Maaz, lotus stems, potatoes and mutton cooked on low heat and gravy thickened with garam masala and caraway seeds.
  Maaz Vangun, aubergine with meat.
  Syun Oluv, mutton preparation made with potato and cooked with hing and spices.
 Kokur Aloobukhar Korma, chicken cooked with dried plums with Kashmiri ingredients.
  Palak Ta Kokur, spinach with country chicken.
  Gand Ta Kokur, chicken & onion curry.
  Kokur Ta Torreil, chicken with snake gourd.
 Bam Chunth Ta Maaz, quince with lamb.
 Gogjee-aare Ta Maaz, sundried Turnips with Lamb.
  Gaazar Ta Maaz, carrots and mutton.
  Bote-Tser Maaz, lamb and dried apricots.
  Haand Ta Kokur, dandelion greens & chicken.
  Haand Ta Maaz, dry dandelion and meat curry. Old age Kashmiri recipe for lactating mothers.
  Ruwangun Shimla Mirch Kokur, tomato capsicum and chicken curry.
 Haakh Maaz, Kashmiri saag cooked with mutton.
  Woste Haakh Ta Maaz, green/red leaves with lamb.
 Monje Ta Maaz, Kashmiri style knol khol and mutton. Kashmiris don't only eat knol khol, its leaves are mandatory.
  Gole Al Syun, pumpkin cooked with lamb.
  Torreil Ta Maaz, ridged gourd with mutton.
  Monje Qaliya, kohlrabi with mutton.
  Rogan Josh, a lamb based dish, cooked in a gravy seasoned with liberal amounts of Kashmiri chillies (in the form of a dry powder), ginger (also powdered), garlic, onions or asafoetida , gravy is mainly Kashmiri spices and mustard oil based. The Persian and central Asian influence is evident in the large quantities of saffron, and asafoetida, favourite Persian flavourings, and the Mughals cultivated these plants in the subcontinent to provide their cooks with a ready supply. Kashmiri Muslims use praan (a type of shallot), plus garlic and cockscomb flower for colouring. Columnist Vir Sanghvi has nominated it as world's most famous Indian curry.
  Kokur Roghan Josh, fried chicken cooked in cock's comb flower gravy with Kashmiri condiments.
  Hindi Roghan Josh, Roghan Josh with tamarind.
  Vunth Roghan Josh, for the past two decades, camel meat is sold on the occasion of Eid-ul-Azha in keeping with the tradition of Muhammad who mostly used to sacrifice camels on holy occasions.
  Pachi Roghan Josh, trotter in red gravy.Yakhean, a yoghurt-based mutton gravy without turmeric or chilli powder. The dish is primarily flavoured with bay leaves, cloves and cardamom seeds. This is a mild, subtle dish eaten with rice often accompanied with a more spicy side dish. Yakhean came to be known in Kashmir during Akbar's rule. Yoghurt-based meat curries were part of Persian cuisine, and the emperor introduced this style of cooking to his new state when he annexed it in 1586.
 Kokur Yakhean, succulent pieces of chicken cooked in curd flavoured in Kashmiri herbs.
  Chuste, spicy dry curry of goat's intestines.
 Naihkala Ta Phendeir Yakhean, certain parts of innards of sheep or goat, cooked with curd.
 Chhagael Yakhean, testes of sheep or goat cooked in curd etc.
  Damin Yakhean, tripe yakhni (curd curry).
 Shyaem, minced mutton cutlets cooked with curd.
  Kokur Shyaem, chicken cutlets in yoghurt.
 Bokavachi Chhagael, kidneys and testes of goat or sheep.
 Charvan, cooked diced liver of sheep or goat.
 Choek Charvan, sour diced liver of goat or sheep.
  Charvan Oluv, curried liver and potatoes.
  Kalle Maaz, goat's head meat.
 Pachi Ta Heri Ras, cooked legs with hoofs, and head of sheep or goat.

Meatballs

The wazas are trained for years to learn the art of making the right cuts and grounding the meat to perfection. Traditionally, the lamb is mashed with walnut wood:

  Goshtabeh minced mutton balls with spices in yogurt gravy. Also known as The Dish of Kings in Kashmir region and the last dish of the banquet. Legendary Bollywood actor Yusuf Khan aka Dilip Kumar was said to love goshtabeh the most. In December 1955, Bakshi Ghulam Mohammad, the then Prime Minister of Jammu and Kashmir and Nikita S. Khurschev, the first secretary of the Soviet Communist party were captured in an iconic photograph feeding each other goshtabeh.
  Riste, meatballs in curry. The meat is derived from either sheep or goat and then pounded very carefully on a wooden block. The perfect meatballs are achieved through maintaining the right temperature throughout the pounding process and laced with kidney fat.
 Beef Riste/Goshtabeh.
 Palak Rista, usually four small 'rista' pieces, along with some spinach Leaves, are ladled on a 'Traem' for four guests.
 Safed Rista, Goshtabeh meatballs are the biggest, next rista and palak rista meatballs are the tiniest.

Vegetarian Sides

  Dum Olav/Dum Aloo, potato cooked with ginger powder, fennel and other hot spices. The most skillful part is to prick potatoes after frying them so that the gravy or the sauce gets absorbed in the potato, making them spongy and enhancing the flavour profile of the multiple potato-folds.
  Wazel Aelwa, forgotten aloo recipe mostly cooked in the villages.
  Matar Olav, potatoes peas curry. A classic side dish that is regularly paired with white rice (batta).
  Olav Dude Legit, potatoes in yoghurt.
  Gande te Matar, onions and peas.
  Gande te Hemb, green beans and onions gravy.
  Boda Razmaah Ta Olav, green beans and potatoes.
  Razmah Hemb Ta Nadir, spicy French beans with lotus stems.
  Razmah Hemb Ta Vangan, French beans with aubergine.
  Tamatar Vangan, Kashmiri eggplant in Tomatoes.
  Band Gupi Ta Tamatar, cabbage cooked with tomatoes.
  Nadir Palak, lotus roots and spinach. This is a side dish served in big feasts and dinners.
 Ranith Bam Chunth Khanji, cooked quince. Quince is a very popular fruit with Kashmiri people. It is generally not eaten raw because it has a dry, tangy taste, but on cooking, it becomes sweet and very flavorful. In olden days, it was baked in daans (clay ovens). The simmering heat of the leftover embers would turn them yummy.
  Bam Chunth Vangun, quince & eggplants.
  Bam Chunth Nadir, quince with lotus stem.
  Dued Vangan, eggplants with yoghurt.
  Karel Ta Vangun, Kashmiri Karela Baingan (Bitter Gourd & Eggplants).
  Al Kanej Ta Vangan, pumpkin greens with aubergine.
  Tsounth Vangan, green apple curry. Apples and aubergines, both are sliced long and fried. The oil is tempered with asafoetida (yangu) and the usual spices. If apples are on the sweeter side, a few drops of lemon juice are added. This sweet and tangy creation made from sour apple and aubergines is a popular one once autumn arrives in the valley.
  Tsoek Vangan, a popular dish of eggplant fried and cooked with tamarind.
  Choek Vangan-Hachi, sundried eggplant instead of the fresh vegetable.
  Gole Al Doon Gooje, pumpkin with walnuts.
  Hoch Haand, dried dandelion greens, boiled and ground to a pasty texture.
  Ruwangun Hachi, Dried tomatoes.
  Barith Marchawangan, Kashmiri stuffed chillies.
  Phak'e Olav, mid-day snack of potatoes fried in mustard oil, on few monthly Pandit fasts such as poornima and ashtami.
  Monje Haakh, kholrabi being a delicacy.
  Dum Monje, knol khol (karam/gaanth gobhi/kohlrabi/ German turnip) in Yoghurt.
  Dum Phul Gupi, cauliflowers cooked in their own moisture.
  Phul Gupi Olav, cauliflower with potatoes.
  Haakh, Wosteh Haakh (red orach), Heanz Haakh, Sotchal (mallow), Kretch (knapweed), Handh (dandelion), Obuj (sorrel), Lissa (amaranth), Nuner (purslane), among others; collard greens is enjoyed by Kashmiri people and they have their own versions of cooking the same with cottage cheese, mutton or chicken.
  Bhat Haakh, also known as Sabz Haakh. Bhat is Kashmiri for Pandit. Haakh is eaten by everyone in Kashmir, but is a Kashmiri Pandit specialty.
  Dagith Haakh, mashed collard greens.
  Gogjee Haakh, turnip greens with a pinch of asafoetida.
  Wapal Haakh, teasel leaves (Dipsacus Inermis).
  Wosteh Haakh Ta Zombre Thool, orach paired with hard-boiled eggs.
  Haakh Nadir, collards or kales cooked with lotus roots.
  Haakh Ta Olav, potatoes and greens.
  Haakh Vangan, collard greens with brinjal.
  Sotchal Nadur, mallow (Malva Parviflora) is a wild vegetable found anywhere on the roadsides, parks, playgrounds, grazing lands, etc. The earliest account of this plant appears to have been written by a Greek author named Pedamus Dioscorides in the first century AD. The dish is liked by all, young and old particularly because of its limited availability in foreign markets.
  Sotchal Vangan, mallow leaves & baigan. The dish is made from sotchal and thool-vangan. Thool-Vangan is a small eggplant that has not grown into its full size. It is soft and fleshy with a minimal amount of seeds.
  Mujji Mulivian, mashed radish leaves curry.
  Mujje Patar Ta Vangan, radish leaves with aubergine.
  Gordoul ta Olav, green sour plum plucked from trees with potatoes.
  Gordoul ta Lissa, green sour plum with tender foliage of amaranth.
  Zamutdodh Cuar, yoghurt curry stirred continuously on low heat.
  Olav Bum, a delicious dry dish prepared with potatoes and water lily plant commonly found in ponds and lakes of Kashmir.
  Al Roghan Josh, pumpkin Roghan Josh.
  Bandh Roghan Josh, cabbage simmered in a fusion of authentic spices, and yoghurt to create the signature vegetarian 'sibling' of Roghan Josh.
  Nadir Roghan Josh, lotus root cooked on low heat until the nadur is tender.
  Gogjee Nadur, Lotus stem with Turnips.
  Cshte Gogjee, turnips.
  Cshte Mujji, boiled and mildly spiced radishes.
  Cshte Band Gupi, boiled and mildly spiced cabbage (with asafoetida).
  Choek Nadur, lotus-root with tartaric acid (tatri).
  Choek Mujji/Mujji Kalaa, long radishes with tamarind paste.
  Choek Al, gourd with tamarind.
 Al-Yakhean, bottle-gourd cooked in yoghurt based gravy and flavoured with Kashmiri condiments.
  Phool Yakhean, cauliflower in yogurt sauce.
  Hedar Yakhean, mushrooms yakhni.
  Nadir Yakhean, lotus root cooked with yoghurt.
  Nutree Yakhean, soya chunks yakhni.
  Karel Yakhean, prepared bitter gourds cooked until gravy thickens with yogurt.
  Vangan Yakhean, fried aubergine in yoghurt.
  Pudna Al, pumpkin with mint.
  Torreil Ta Vangan, ridged gourd with eggplant. This vegetable is available in the summer and is sweet in taste and very easy to cook.
  Torreil Ta Tamatar, ridged gourd with tomatoes.
  Variphali Olav, potato curry with hot lentil dumplings. This dish is a Punjabi preparation but very much enjoyed by Kashmiris.

Mushrooms

Grown in the foothills of the Himalayas, Gucchi mushrooms (kanaguchhi) are the costliest among fungi in the world. They grow in clusters on logs of decaying wood in Kashmir:

  Kanaguchhi Yakhean, morels cooked in rich yoghurt gravy.
  Kanaguchhi Matar Masala, an absolute flavour bomb of delicious morels picked by locals.
  Guchhi Ver, kanaguchhi (morchella esculenta) mushroom with traditional Kashmiri spice mix, an uncommon dish cooked by Suman Kaul, a self-trained masterchef.
  Shajkaan, aka Kanpapar (Geopora Arenicola) mushroom, fried with onions and tomatoes, or even prepared with milk.

Tschaman (Cottage Cheese)

  Tschaman Kanti, cubes of cottage cheese that are fried, tossed in select spices and stir fried with onions and tomatoes.
  Lyader Tschaman. lyadur means yellow which is due to the presence of turmeric, and tschaman is cottage cheese. The term 'yellow gravy' might not do justice to the complexity of flavor you get from layering nine spices, some of them whole, with green chilies and simmering them in water before thickening the sauce with milk. British Indian chef Romy Gill called it 'a bowl of golden yellow deliciousness'.
  Veth Tschaman, also known as Vozij Tschaman. This is the rogan josh equivalent.
  Ruwangan Tschaman, cottage cheese in tomato gravy.
  Palak/Haakh Tschaman, cottage cheese prepared in spinach based gravy peppered with Kashmiri ingredients.
  Mith Tschaman, panir with fenugreek.
  Mith Tschaman Ta Niul Kara, panir and fenugreek with green peas.
  Matar Tschaman, turmeric matar paneer. Traditionally, the paneer is meant to be deep fried.
  Torreil Ta Tschaman, ridged gourd with paneer.
  Tschaman Monje Qaliya, kohlrabi with paneer. Used to be made in big degchis on mehendiraat.
  Kanaguchhi Tschaman, Kashmiri morels with paneer in a tangy gravy.
  Gogjee-aare Ta Tschaman, dried turnips with cottage cheese.
  Tschaman Vangan, panir and brinjals.

Chutneys/Raitas

Called the shadowy underbelly of the Kashmiri wazwan, they add real colour to the dishes:

 Zamut Dodh, plain homemade yoghurt.
 Muj Chetein, translates to radish in yoghurt. A unique blend of grated radish and yoghurt, seasoned with a pinch of roasted cumin. The Kashmiri version of the quintessential raita.
  Doon Chetein, walnut chutney. Made with walnuts, yoghurt, dried mint, green chillies, red chilli powder and fresh coriander.
   Doon Muj Chetein, Walnut-Radish Raita.
  Zeresht Chetein, Barberry.
  Anardan Chetein, prepared with dried pomegranate seeds (called anardana) along with coriander and mint leaves.
  Gand Chetein, Kashmiri onion chutney. Made with sliced onions which are soaked in vinegar and flavoured with dried mint leaves and red chilli powder.
  Zirish Chetein. Blackcurrants.
  Aelchi Chetein, sour cherries with a bit of salt.
  Gordoul Chetein, sour plum chutney.
  Pudna Chetein/Buran, a light chutney made out of green chillies and fresh mint.
  Ruwangun Chetein, tomatoes sautéed with green chillies and oil, until most of their juices evaporate.
  Ruwangun Haech Chetein, sun-dried tomato chutney.
  Martswangun Chetein, green chilli chutney ground in a mortar.
  Kishmish Chetein, condimented sauce of raisins.
  Chounth Ta Danival Chetein, apple & coriander chutney.
  Aloo Bukhar Chetein, made with fresh plums, onions, sugar, lime juice and spices.
  Muj Chetein (variation), sautéed grated radish in mustard oil.
  Buzith Nadir Chetein, roasted lotus stem chutney.
  Buza/Foata Vangan, roasted/boiled and mashed brinjals mixed with curd.
  Dodh Al/Al Raita, bottle Gourd in yoghurt.

Meat Stir-Fries

 Mutton/Chicken Kanti, small boneless mutton/chicken pieces, marinated, shallow fried in fresh onions, tomatoes and green chillies.
  Kabab Kanti, kababs cooked with green chillies, tomatoes and onions.
  Matsch Barith Karel, bitter gourd stuffed with minced lamb.
 Matar Machh, green Peas and Minced Mutton.
  Sotchal Charvan, mallow leaves & liver.
 Hedar, Chhagael, Bokavachi, Ta Krehnamaz, mushrooms with testes, kidneys and liver of sheep or goat.
 Talith Kaed, fried brains of goat or sheep.
 Kaed Pakora, brain fritters.

Fish

Kashmir is full of fresh water lakes and rivers:

  Nader ti Gaad, fish (Bilose, Zob, Indian Major Carp, Catla, Rohu, Margarita, Mahseer, Snow Trout, Niger, Chush, Khront, Churu etc.) cooked with lotus stem, a delicacy cooked on festival days like Eid, Navroze and Gaadi Batti (Festival of Kashmiri Pandits).
  Mujh Gaad, a dish of radishes with a choice of fish.
 Haak Gaad, Fish curry cooked with kashmiri spinach.
 Gada Ta Gogjee/Monjje/Band Gupi, Fish cooked with Turnips, or Knol Khol, or Cabbage.
  Gaad Ta Chounth, fish cooked with green apples.
  Gaad Qaliya, fish in yellow gravy.
  Ruwangan/Tamatar Gaad, white river fish cooked delicately in a tomato gravy.
  Kong Gaad, fish with saffron flowers.
 Hogada Ta Haakh/Bum, dried fish (bolinao and others) with 'karam' saag or dried water-lily stems.
 Hogada Tscchuar, roasted dried small fish.
 Kanz Ta Gaad/Guran, fish or small fish or very small dried fish, cooked with slightly fermented but non-alcoholic drink sadre kaenz. In the old days, when one family in a neighbourhood would make kaenz it was understood it belonged equally to the rest to be used whenever required. The heat of the generously used spices like chili and ginger powder in this popular dish is supposed to be tempered by the cooling effect of this rice beer-like brew.
 Fari/Phari, smoked fish. A winter delicacy prepared in a particular method by only a few remaining households in Srinagar's Tiploo Mohalla. The fish used is a variety of trout belonging to the genus Schizothorax.
  Phari Ta Haakh, smoked fish with collard greens. The skin of the smoked fish is removed and it is fried until it turns reddish-brown. The fish is added to collard greens and cooked until all the water is absorbed and oil floats on top. Best had with steamed rice, and best not to reheat the dish.

Salads

  Salaad, a plate of sliced vegetables precisely cucumber, tomatoes and carrots, decorated in concentric circles on a plate. A side with lemon squeezed on top.

Rice

Kashmiris eat a lot more rice than the people of the Jammu region:

  Batta, steamed white rice.
  Buzz Batta, fried rice.
  Waazeh Polav, a mildly sweet royal pulao flavoured with saffron and aromatic spices.
  Gucchi Polav, Kashmiri pulao with black morels.
  Matar Polav, a variation of plain rice with peas, fresh or frozen added.
  Tahaer, yellow rice. Prepared by Pandits on auspicious occasions, Muslims also prepare it on certain occasions.
  Khetchar, made with rice and chilke wali moong dal, it is best enjoyed with monje aanchar.
  Neni Moonge Khetchar, mutton and whole green lentils cooked in mustard oil and finished on dum with Basmati rice.
  Vaer, Salted Rice Pudding with kernels of walnuts or intestines of sheep or goat. Always cooked by Kashmiri Pandits at the beginning of Weddings or 'Yagneopavit' ceremony.
  Mayir, saltish pudding of rice cooked with diluted curd from which generally butter has been separated. Mostly prepared in rural areas particularly after a week or so on the happy occasion of the delivery of a cow. In Srinagar and the adjoining districts, the dish is called dodh wugre.
  Yaji, boiled and steam-cooked salty rice-flour cakes.

Breads

  Kinke Tschut, a whole wheat unleavened flatbread cooked on a griddle.
  Parott, a buttery flatbread. A one-kilo paratha is served outside a Sufi shrine in Kashmir. Celebrity chef Sanjeev Kapoor has stated he used to make rumali roti but not such a big paratha.
  Puer, small round of deep fried and puffed wheaten cake. Served hot, these are relished with vegetable preparations or sweet dishes.
  Tschur Tschut, Spicy rice crêpes typically eaten with breakfast chai.
  Zyur Tschut, this savoury pancake is prepared from rice flour, cumin and green chillies.
  Tomul Tschut, rotis made with rice flour.
  Dranna, rice bread crumbs.
  Makai Tschut, corn flour chapatti.
  Gyav Tschut, as the name suggests, made with generous amounts of ghee, served with rogan josh.
  Makai Woer, afternoon bread prepared with corn flour that is relished with tea.
  Gari Tschut, bread made from water chestnut flour.
  Gari Puer, deep fried small rounds of water chestnut flour.
  Vushki Tschut, baked rounds of barley flour.

Eggs

In certain rural areas, the tradition of putting an egg or two in kanger (fire pot) is known to each individual. The fragrance of an egg cooking in the kanger would trigger the enzymes signaling the egg is ready:

  Thool Mond, omelette.
  Haak Ta Thool, collard greens and Eggs together.
  Prezdar Ta Thool, Foxtail lilies with eggs, eaten locally in Kupwara.
  Puch Gand Ta Thool, fresh spring onions and eggs, eaten with warm parathas or roti.
  Wosteh Haakh Ta Thool, red spinach with eggs.
  Zombre Thool Ta Dal, a Kashmiri traditional dish of red lentils (masoor) and hard-boiled eggs.
  Thool Zambur, Kashmiri egg curry.
  Gogjee-aare Ta Zombre Thool, dried turnip and boiled egg.
  Zombre Thool Ta Ruwangan Hachi, fried eggs in a tomato reduction with ginger, garlic and green chillies.
  Ver Thool, Kashmiri spicy scrambled eggs.

Game/Hunted Animals (Shikaar)

Going by estimates, on an average 50-60 birds are killed every day in wetlands across Kashmir: Hunted game (shikaar) is not generally cooked immediately. It has to be hung for some days (faisander) before dressing it for cooking. Hanging makes the meat suppler and less fibrous, making it tastier to eat. Game dishes are:

  Pacchin Dumpokhta, pintail. It is a delicacy enjoyed by Kashmiri Hindus who would not normally eat chicken. The migratory bird looks like a duck but can fly with great speed. It comes to wetlands of Kashmir during winter.
  Batook Palak, duck with spinach.
  Batook Ta Zamut Dodh, duck in a curd curry.
  Gogji Ta Batook, duck with turnip. Autumn (harud) duck has a lot of flavor in it.
 Shikar Rogan Josh, Roghan Josh of hunted game birds and animals such as mallard, geese, plover, snipe, rail, teal, quail, pintail, Wigeon, grouse, partridge, pheasant, spotted deer, hangal, antelope, wild goat etc.
 Shikar Ta Nadeir, meat of game birds cooked with lotus roots.
  Shikar Ta Haand, ducks and mallards prepared with dried dandelion.

Dals

Kashmiri Pandits who were vegetarian and did not even eat onions and tomatoes were known as Dal Battas (Dal Pandits):

  Dal Nadur, Lotus stem boiled with green beans to make a dal.
  Vaari Muth Dal, Black Turtle Beans (Kashmiri Vaari Muth).
  Vaari Muth Gogjee, black turtle beans cooked with turnips.
  Razmah Dal, a red kidney bean stew with classic Kashmiri spice flavours of powdered ginger and fennel.
 Razmah Gogjee, Kidney beans cooked with turnips.
 Gogji aare ta Razmah, turnip circles are slow simmered with creamy rajma dal flavoured with ground ginger and fennel seeds over a gentle flame.
  Razmah Hemb, Various green beans cooked with tender pods.
  Dal Dabbi, Traditional lentil preparation cooked in milk with spices.
  Channe Baegle,Native to the valley of Kashmir, the dried  dal is loved more in winters.
  Razmah Nadur 
  Thool Razmah Ta Oluv, fresh cranberry beans with potatoes.
  Thool Razmah Yakhean, green kidney beans in yoghurt.
  Vangun Hachi Ta Moonge Dal, Dried brinjals with moong.

Fermented foods

Kashmiri is one of the tangiest cuisines of the world. Pickling has an important role in the food history of Kashmir that used to remain cut off because of harsh winters:

  Aanchar, Pickles (chicken, mutton, fish, greylag goose, mango, cherry, bitter gourd, amla, apple, apricot, plum, garlic, turnip, chillies, knol-khols, radishes, carrots, onions, cauliflowers, brinjals, lotus roots, green almonds, hard pears, grapes peppers etc.)

Street food

  Pumm-Buchh, lotus seeds, soft watery white and sweet to taste.
  Makai Waet, roasted corn.
  Buzith Gaer, roasted water chestnuts. Excursionists sit around a hot roasted small heap of nuts and with the help of two stones, one big and the other small, pound these one by one and extract the kernels.
  Monje Guel, fritters of water chestnut kernels. Also called mesa or gaer guel in Kashmiri.
 Nadur Maunj, sliced lotus stems marinated in spicy paste and deep fried.
  Gaad Maunj, deboned fish deep fried in spiced flour.
  Tandoori Chicken, Afghani Chicken, Chicken Lemon, varieties of street food at Khayam, Srinagar.
   Deep-fried Kababs.
  Mutton Keema Samosas, Chicken Keema Samosas etc.
  Alla Posh Mond, pumpkin flower fritters.
  Olav Mond/Monjivor, potato patty with ginger.
  Tillae Karrae, chickpeas or dried green peas, coated in a batter of flour and deep fried.
  Mongh Masale, steamed black gram or kala moongh is mixed with salt and red chilli powder and served hot.
  Matar, Kashmiri street food.
  Chunth Pakori, crisp slices of batter-coated and fried green apple.
  Vangan Pakori, fried aubergine coated with gram flour.
  Nadur Churma, lotus stem fries.
  Olav Churma, fries.
 Kruhun Masale/Dub Maha, a poor man's shawarma, a thin roti is made of refined flour in which boiled chana is rolled and then dipped in tomato chutney.
 Razmah Masale, rajma with corn.
  Masala Tschut, chickpea masala spread over a lavasa (kashmiri naan). The preparation for making masaal begins during the night or early hours of the morning. Then different kinds of chutneys or sauces are prepared. Radish chutney mixed with fresh curd, green chilli, coriander, pepper and salt is served with it and lastly the soft bread is used for wrapping.
  Egg Roll  Dastar Katlama, famous halwai food.
  Paratha Halwa, soft fried rotis with sweet suji ka halwa paste.
  Tobruk Halwa Paratha, deep fried poori with halwa.
  Gaer Gojje, water chestnuts.
  Mong V'or, moong Bean Patty.
  Chilgozay, peanuts.

Cheese

The nomadic shepherds of the Kashmir valley, Gujjars and Bakerwals move their herd of dairy cattle and their own settlements up and down the mountains based on changing seasons:

 Maesh Crari., described as the mozzarella of Kashmir. The discs are first coated with chilli, turmeric and salt, and then fried in mustard oil until they form a crisp, golden outer layer and the inside stays soft and creamy.
 Kudan, a rare Gujjar goat cheese that looks like paneer but is more crumbly and akin to feta. Kudan is prepared in Bakerwal tents by heating some mustard oil in a pot on fire and then mixing some salt, turmeric and chilli along with the kudan cheese curds. Everything melts together into a golden liquid flecked with red chilli and small nuggets of kudan.

Desserts

  Chounth Halwa.
  Barfi, a milk-based sweet dish.
  Khatai, a Kashmiri sweet biscuit that crumbles on each bite.
  Khandde Gazir, crunchy bites of sugared sweet treats.
  Modur Polav, milk, saffron, ghee and cinnamon are used to make this pulao with a plethora of dry fruits such as almonds, cashews and raisins.
  Khir, rice pudding.
 Kong Phirin, saffron flavoured rice pudding garnished with nuts.
  Seemni, vermicelli kheer.
  Shufta, a traditional dessert made with chopped dry fruits, spices like pepper powder, cardamom and more, in sugar syrup, garnished with rose petals.
  Shufta Kanagucchi, cottage cheese, dry fruits, saffron, milk, desi ghee and morels from Srinagar.
  Mitha Kanagucchi, morels in syrup.
  Kofta Khumani, mince apricots.
  Roth, something between a cake and a bread, these sweet rotis made with flour, ghee, yoghurt, poppy seeds, eggs (on special occasions) and sugar are a domestic favourite. The art of baking a perfect roth is as much an acquired skill as it is a relearned discipline passed down from generations.
  Basrakh, A sweet delicacy made from flour with a touch of ghee.
  Tosha, an age-old Kashmiri dessert.
  Shangram, dried halwa balls.
  Lyde, kashmiri dessert made with whole wheat flour.
  Nabad, crystallized sugar.
  Gulkand, indigenous rose preserved in a sugar base.
  Matka Kulfi, kulfi topped with cold noodles.
  Kesar Kulfi.
  Dry Fruit Kulfi.

English pastry

Before 1918, Abdul Ahad Bhat, of Ahdoos, was under the tutelage of English bakers at Nedou's, a hotel in Srinagar owned by Austro-Swiss Michael Nedou. He quickly picked up the art of baking, and started a small bakery, the first by a Kashmiri at that time. Ahdoos's forte was English goodies, and as India inched towards freedom from British Rule he added Kashmiri items to the menu. Mughal Darbar was established on Residency Road in 1984 and on the road parallel is Jee Enn, founded by Ghulam Nabi Sofi in 1972. Many of the owners and staff of these new bakeries have trained in Ahdoos. The variety of pastries include:

 Chicken or Mutton Patty, meat seasoned with salt, pepper and garlic, encased in layered puff pastry.
  Puffs.
 Cream Rolls.
 Cream Buns.
 Coconut Macaroons.
 Walnut Macaroons.
 Walnut Tart, made possible by the easy availability of walnut kernels in Kashmir.
  Walnut Fudge, an exclusivity of Kashmir's Moonlight Bakery, the recipe contains 'snow-white walnuts' from Uri and honey and dates from local market.

Other Baked foods
The Kashmir Valley is noted for its bakery tradition, that of the Qandarwan. Nowhere else in the Indian subcontinent can be found such a huge variety of leavened breads, another pointer to the Central Asian influence on Kashmiris' food habits. On the Dal Lake in Kashmir or in downtown Srinagar, bakery shops are elaborately laid out. Bakers sell various kinds of breads with golden brown crusts topped with sesame and poppy seeds. Tsot and tsochvor are small round breads topped with poppy and sesame seeds, which are crisp and flaky, sheermal, baqerkhayn (puff pastry), lavas (unleavened bread) and kulcha are also popular. Girdas and lavas are served with butter.

Kashmiri bakerkhani has a special place in Kashmiri cuisine. It is similar to a round naan in appearance, but crisp and layered, and sprinkled with sesame seeds. It is typically consumed hot during breakfast.

Wazwan

Beverages

 Noon Chai or Sheer Chai 
Kashmiris are heavy tea drinkers. Kashmiris don't use the word "Kashmiri Chai". The word "Noon" in Kashmiri means salt. The most popular drink is a pinkish colored salted tea called "noon chai." It is made with black tea, milk, salt and bicarbonate of soda. The particular color of the tea is a result of its unique method of preparation and the addition of soda. The Kashmiri Hindus more commonly refer to this chai as "Sheer Chai." The Kashmiri Muslims refer to it as "Noon Chai" or "Namkeen Chai", both meaning salty tea.

Noon Chai or Sheer Chai is a common breakfast tea in Kashmiri households and is taken with breads like baqerkhani brought fresh from Qandur (Kashmiri : کاندر ) or bakers. It is one of the most basic and essential food items in a Kashmiri household. Tea was as served in large samavars. Now, the use of Samavars is limited to special occasions and normally kettles are used.

Nuts like almonds and pistachios and edible rose petals can also be added before serving and sometimes malai or fresh cream is added to give the tea viscosity and richness.

Lipton chai
In Kashmir, chai is essentially salty pink tea. Anything else is called Lipton chai because Lipton was the first brand of tea that came along selling chai.

Kahwah
At marriage feasts, festivals, and religious places, it is customary to serve kahwah – a green tea made with saffron, spices, and almonds or walnuts. Over 20 varieties of Kahwah are prepared in different households. Some people also put milk in kahwah (half milk and half kahwah). This chai is also known as "Maugal Chai" by some Kashmiri Hindus from the smaller villages of Kashmir. Kashmiri Muslims and Kashmiri Hindus from the cities of Kashmir refer to it as Kahwah or Qahwah.

Natural Mineral Water

From one of the oldest and purest spring waters of Kashmir, the Kokernag Spring, Bringi Spring Water has high alkalinity and is well balanced with minerals.

Babribyol

The Babribyol sharbat is a concoction of sweetened milk, rose water or Rooh Afza syrup, and soaked sweet basil seeds that are grown locally.

Lyaess

Made from yoghurt or kefir, Kashmiri lassi (lyaess) is a liquid, salty way to drink up yoghurt. The process of churning the buttermilk with a wooden choomph or churner is rhythmic and there is an art involved. The yoghurt has to be churned the right way, the buttery fats have to float to the top in a nice froth, the spices and dried mint leaves have to be just right.

Sadr-e-kaenz

This fermented rice water drink is supposed to be very good for a sluggish liver.

Shahi Sheera

Made by extracting the juice of different berries, it is prepared at home during Ramadan. It features in 1977 Kashmiri film Arnimaal where guests are sipping on the beverage during wedding festivities.

Food and beverage pairings

The traditional Kashmiri wazwan, which comprises slow-cooked meat dishes is a wonderful pairing that enhances the spicy notes of whisky. The Loire Valley wine Sancerre goes well with Kashmiri goshtabeh. A ripe fruity red works well with the full bodied roghan josh. A recommended wine to try with is Montepulciano.

Special Occasions & Festivals

Eid-ul-Fitr

While on fast, Muslims avoid consuming food during the day, while at dusk, they indulge in extra-special, bountiful meals prepared during the day. The menu for Ramadan month includes khajur ka laddoo (date balls), babribyol (basil seeds), kulfi, phirin, seemni, fruit chaat, fruit custard, kateer (a drink loaded with health benefits) and noon chai. The smell of slow-cooked mutton hovers, fragrant and sultry in the air, and despite the familiar air of unpredictability in Srinagar, spirits are high and streets are filled with happy greetings of Eid Mubarak.

Eid-ul-Adha

As the festival draws to a close, most well-to-do families start placing orders with the wazas for the feast, which is cooked by chefs at their own places and then sold to the customers for serving at their homes. Sacrificial animals include Delhi Walla, Merino Cross, Bakerwal and Kashmiri varieties of sheep.

Urs of Hazrat Sheikh Dawood

Only vegetarian food is supplied to devotees. Majority of people in Batmaloo and adjoining areas turn vegetarian and do not eat meat or chicken. They widely consume dried turnips (gogji aare) because it is believed, during Dawood's time, sundried turnips helped Kashmir survive a famine.

Urs of Khwaja Masood Wali

The people of Pampore cook dried vegetables, eggs, cheese and other food stuff except meat and invite their relatives, friends on lunch or dinner to keep the tradition of the saint alive.

Urs of Dastageer Sahab

In Khanyar and Sarai Bala areas of Srinagar, the devotees are seen outside the shrines where local and non-local business establishments install their carts and are seen selling the Kashmiri traditional food stuff. Pious men sing hearty hymns over offerings of dates and sweets.

Urs of Raeshmol Saheb

People in Anantnag district in southern Kashmir quit eating meat as a mark of respect for the 16th century mystic. Rarely is a butcher shop open during these seven days. For three-and-a-half days each before and after the saint's Urs, people eat radish braised in tamarind.

Muharram

The first ten days of Muharram, that mark the tragedy of Karbala, the milk-based rice pudding mayir is prepared. Throughout the 10th day, Ashoora, kahwa is served to guests and mayir and sharbat distributed to mourners on the street.

Herath

For Kashmiri Pandits, the prasad offering at Shivratri puja is a charger piled high with rice, cooked lamb and fish, and a luscious raw fish in its entirety atop the pile.

Khets Mavas

Celebrated on the amavasya or the last day of the dark fortnight of Pausha(December–January), Khets Mavas or Yakshamavasya is an important festival of Kashmiri Pandits. A mutton khichdi with fresh mutton marinated in a bit of curd is offered as sacrificial food.

Har Navum

On the 9th day of the month of ashad, Pandits in Kashmir offer the deity Sharika yellow rice cooked with turmeric, a little oil and salt along with tsarvan (goat's liver).

Diaspora & fusion cuisines

Tibetan exiles in Kashmir, including members of Tibet's small Muslim population live in Srinagar, mainly in a small area near the 18th-century Hari Parbat fort. Popular momo (beef dumplings) shops and Tibetan restaurants are run by their children. Tibetan options include Cantonese chicken and kumloo wonton, fried pasta stuffed with minced mushrooms.

Kashmiri Sikh cuisine has a bit of influence from Punjab with onions and tomatoes, but the flavouring goes the Kashmiri way with elements such as badyaan(saunf). A large number of Indian tourists depend entirely on Vaishno Dhabas, the Valley's generic non-A/C restaurants that serve all-vegetarian North Indian fare.

 Cooking Methods 

Kashmiri recipes are meant to be passed down through teaching, from mother to daughter in cramped kitchens, standing together over pots of sputtering oil.

Braising
The leaves of Kashmiri haakh are braised in lots of water. It is very important to ensure that the haakh stays submerged underwater during the initial cooking process using a wooden spatula or large spoon to continuously push the greens down. Mustard oil, which is used extensively in Kashmiri cuisine, imparts an extra flavour to the dish.

Court-bouillon
The main skill of a wazwan lies in the preparation of a stock made of onions and shallots.

Tempering
Whole spices must be fried in oil – clove, cardamom, cinnamon, bay leaves. Fried too little, and the dish will be lifeless, without fragrance. A second too much, and one will be left with nothing but bitterness.

Caramelisation
Sliced onions are fried until golden brown and pureed with minimal water.

Emulsification
The yoghurt must be fatty, thick. Dried mint, just a pinch, is added right at the end to freshen the dish.

Simmering
The food gets its flavours and textures from the spices being slow cooked with ingredients until they let out their inherent juices and fats and melt together.

Dum cooking
The cooking vessel in the shab deg is sealed with dough before being cooked over a simmering fire through the long winter night.

TenderisingGoshtabeh and rista, the two meatball dishes are rarely found outside the valley because their unique texture is enormously challenging. The sheep has to be freshly slaughtered and the meat pounded before rigor mortis sets.

Cooking material
The quality of pots is important, according to wosta (ustad) or chef Nazir Ahmed Aram. He says they must have the right content of copper. Using wood (walnut and apple are the best) is important too. Cooking on gas is not the same.

Special Equipment

The special equipment used to cook Kashmiri food are:

 Dan 
On normal days the cooking in both Hindu and Muslim homes is mostly done on a dan, which is an oblong clay oven about 3 ft by 2 ft in length and a foot and a half in height.

 Traem 

These are large brass plates used for serving food.

 Leij/Deigul/Deigcha 

Among Kashmiri Pandits, most dishes are cooked in pots of baked clay. Pots used in Kashmir are round-bottomed.

 Tasht-naar 

These are a portable washbasin and a pitcher that are passed around to wash hands during big banquets.

 Goshpar-Kaen 

These are a flat coarse stone and a wooden mallet made of walnut wood used for pounding meat to a fine texture.

 Krech 

These are different kinds of wooden spoons and ladles used for turning the food in clay pots so that the base does not get scraped.

 Khalur-Dula 

This is a stone mortar with a wooden pestle used for grinding chutneys and pastes.

 Samovar 

This jug-shaped metallic pitcher has a long tube inside that is filled with charcoal, which keeps the tea in the pot brewing.

Similarities with other national cuisines

Much like Kashmir, its people, and its narrative traditions, Kashmiri cuisine too is an amalgam of influences from Central Asia, Persia, China, and the Indian subcontinent. Food recipes passed down from one culture to another are:

 Aab Gosh (Kashmiri). Abgoosht or Abgusht is more so a one-pot Persian comfort food that is a rustic dish with wholesome ingredients. It has been enjoyed by Persians for centuries. There is a similar dish in Armenia, called Abgoosht stew, using beef instead of lamb.
 Baqerkhayn (Kashmiri). Bakharkhani is made in parts of Kolkata. Some believe it originated in present-day Bangladesh.
  Batta (Kashmiri). Short-grain, sticky rice is called bata in Afghanistan.
 Dam Olav (Kashmiri). Bengali alur dom is lightly spiced and slightly sweet potato curry made with onions, tomatoes and spices.
 Harisa (Kashmiri). Al Harees is a traditional Emirati dish consisting of wheat, meat(chicken) and salt. A simple, traditional Saudi dish using crushed wheat is called jareesh. Harissa, also known as herisseh, harisa or keshkeg in Armenia is a wheat berry and meat porridge. The wheat, usually known as korkot, is shelled making them quicker to cook. In Oman, it is made with beaten rice instead of wheat. Boko Boko Harees in Burundian cuisine is a delicacy prepared with chicken, turmeric and bulgur wheat. In the cities of South of Iran, the dish is called Hareese and the meat might be lamb, beef, mutton, turkey or chicken. Amritsari Hareesa is a famous dish of the winter season in Lahore, Pakistan and made with wheat and meat. It is seasoned with desi ghee and served with hot naan.
 Kabab (Kashmiri). The Turkish word kebap derives from Arabic kabaab meaning roasted meat. A likely East Semitic root means to burn, to char or to roast. The Babylonian Talmud even teaches that offerings in the temple should not be kabbaba (burnt). Kysaa-ı Yusuf was the first to refer to meat on skewers as a kebab in 1377. Ibn Battuta, the famous Moroccan traveller mentioned that kebab was an integral part of the daily diet of Indian royalty as early as 1200 AD. Some of the world's best and most flavorful kebabs such as Adana Kebab, Urfa kebab, Iskender kebab come from Turkey's southeastern provinces. The Döner kebab was invented by İskender Efendi, who lived in Bursa and hung meats vertically to grill. One of the most popular kabobs you can find on the streets of Iran is kabob koobideh, ground lamb or beef or a combination of the two. The traditional method of cooking Afghan chapli kebab is frying.
 Kahwah (Kashmiri). A staple Afghan tea, kahwah is mild and fragrant, and recipes tend to differ from family to family.
 Katlam (Kashmiri) Qatlama in traditional Turkish means folded which comes from the verb qatlamaq (to fold). Plain katmer is eaten with Turkish white cheese and Turkish tea. In Turkmenistan, a type of bread in baked from flour which is mixed with milk and egg. This is called katlama. It is also cooked in Azerbaijan, and various herbs are added to it. The fried Kazakh bread Kattama is very popular in Central Asia. Katama is an onion-filled swirled flatbread from Kyrgyzstan. In Uzbekistan, katlama is a traditional bread of Sunday mornings served with homemade butter. Qatlama is an Afghan fried sweet pastry topped with sugar or sugar syrups. Qator Gambir or Gambir are Mongolian pancakes which may often be a byproduct, when there is leftover dough from making some other dish. Kutluma is a layered Pakistani flatbread with a crispy, buttery texture. Katlamas feature regularly on the menus of Bangladeshi restaurants in the UK where they nearly always consist of a layer of spiced lamb encased in a fried pastry.
 Kulcha (Kashmiri). In Afghanistan and Northeast Iran, these dried bread biscuits are called kulcha-e-khataye. Koloocheh in Iranian cuisine is a cookie stuffed with cinnamon, sugar and crushed walnuts.
 Lavasa (Kashmiri). The word lavash is repeatedly found in early Turkic written sources. Lavash is a Turkish bread made with flour, water and salt. It can be eaten hot or cold. This paper-thin, blanket-sized bread is one of Armenia's most ancient breads and is still being made today. In Azerbaijan, lavash is baked not only in traditional ovens (tandir) but also in saj, a large convex pan under which fire is made. In Azerbaijan and Iran, it is put on the bride's shoulders or crumbled over her head to wish the couple prosperity.
 Luchi (Kashmiri). Very similar, Bengali luchai is a deep fried puffed bread.
 Nabad (Kashmiri). Nabat in Persian is a type of confectionary mineral composed of relatively large sugar crystals, with bits of saffron in it.
 Nadur (Kashmiri). In Afghan cuisine, Qormah e Nadroo is an onion-and-tomato-based stew using lamb meat or veal, yogurt, lotus roots and coriander.
 Polav (Kashmiri). It looks as if pilaf was invented in Iran some time after the 10th century. The Turks call plain rice sade pilav. Turkey sees pilav primarily as a side dish rather than a main course. Iran is famous for its polos made with aromatic domsiyah rice. The most characteristic ones are based on fruits such as cherries, quinces, or apricots. In Central Asia, the simplest recipe uses onions, meat and carrots. The extravagant court traditions of the Moghul school of cookery makes India home to some very elaborate pulaos. Laborers from western India brought pilaf to the Caribbean, where it is garnished with butter, almonds and pimiento-stuffed green olives.
  Roth(Kashmiri). The Afghan version of the universal West Asian and European sweet egg bread is called rot. In Afghanistan, it is traditionally served when a newborn child is forty days old.
 Sheer Chai (Kashmiri). Qaimak or Sheer chai is often served at celebrations in Afghanistan to toast good health.
 Sheermal (Kashmiri). This bread originated in Persia (shir means milk in Farsi) and made its way through the Silk Route to Afghanistan, Pakistan and India.
 Yakhein (Kashmiri). Patates Yahni or Greek potato stew is a traditional Greek recipe which falls under the category of ladera, meaning dishes prepared only with olive oil with no addition of other fat. Turkish Yahni is a beef stew that is great in cold weather. A 19th century cookbook by Mehmet Kamil listed a total of 14 classic yakhnis. Yakhni nokhod is a traditional Shirazi dish that uses meat, peas, potatoes, onions, salt and turmeric.

 Etiquette of Kashmiri dining 

Kashmiris are gregarious and like to share. Language and Food are the two vital parts of the region's identity. 'One who eats properly shall rule the country' it is said. An interesting wedding tradition from Kashmir involves newlyweds making roti together. While the bride flattens the dough and puts it on the griddle, the groom is responsible for flipping it and making sure it is cooked. Kashmiris are very particular about the taste of dishes. Food connoisseurs can easily taste a single morsel and name the waza who cooked it. When filmmaker Vivek Agnihotri wrote a presumptuous tweet proposing the idea of vegetarian wazwan, social media erupted in spontaneous protest.

In Kashmir, it is said that food should both taste and look good. Its aroma must be appetizing. Success of a meal lies in its appeal to the eyes, nose and then the tongue. Any event, from a minor one such as receiving a guest in one's home, to a major one such as a circumcision or a wedding, becomes a celebration of preparing, laying out, serving and consuming together the most delicious victuals. Delicacies are passed on to neighbours to be relished and there is no shame in asking for something when the nostrils are tickled and tempted by the mouth-watering smells from a neighbour's kitchen.

Giant dastarkhaans (white sheets) are spread on the floor on which the meal is served. However humble or lofty the fare on it, the dastarkhaan has always been the center of warm hospitality and conviviality. In big Kashmiri dinners, a hundred to five hundred people are usually invited. Since insurgency and the resultant violence and bloodshed, food has come to hold even greater meaning as each meal signifies a celebration of life itself. It is worth mentioning that wazas (the descendents of Samarkandi cooks), whose shops are located in particular areas of the city of Srinagar, form a significant political group in Kashmir.

All dishes are eaten by hand as Kashmiris believe in an intimate relationship with food. Even spiritual and religious old biddies feel no qualms in chomping on ear cartilage or marrow bones long after the meal is done, pulverising everything into a heap on the thali. No one bats an eyelid. Kashmiris consider it disrespectful if one refuses food varieties or an extra helping. They can go great lengths to persuade, swearing to die if you refuse an extra serving!

Food-related proverbs
Kashmiri language is abundantly rich in proverbs, witty sayings and idiomatic word-combinations. The proverbs on food themes and situations are:

  Adyav kheyiv chinih adyav kheyiv taki — half the people ate from large dishes, and half from small dishes. A badly arranged dinner.
  Akh chhiwyov masah byak hakah rasah — one man is intoxicated with the juice of the grape, another with juice of vegetables. Pride dwells in everyone, whether he be rich or poor.
 Akh duda biyi maji kyut toak — an uninvited guest wants a (toak) plateful for his mother, in addition to himself. Toak was an earthen plate, in general use in Kashmir in the past. Beggars and some uninvited people pushed themselves in among the guests because of their poverty, or their desire for tasting the delicacies. It is applied where a person is not content with what is willingly offered to him, and demands more.
  Apih hund gyav — a foolish woman's ghee. A foppish person. Kashmiri people, both wealthy and others, rubbed their hair with fresh ghee.
  Batah gajih ruhun — as garlic upon the hearth of a Pandit, so your presence is to me. The ancestors of the Hindus would not eat garlic because of their aphrodisiac effects, having devoted themselves to religion.
  Batook Poth — to have eaten batook poth (duck's backside) is an expression in Kashmiri for someone who talks a lot.
 Chaanis haakhas chha paakuk haajat — does your haakh require hard cooking? A sort of ironic flattery with the sense that your haakh is so delicate, it takes hardly any time to cook.
 Chaantis animu mathun — to grease one's mouth with gruel. To cover up starvation for mere shame.
 Chayi tani ya gani magar tech gachi cheyn — tea, whether weak or strong, should be taken hot.
 Dali Baate ti Khoji thool — dal for a Pandit and an egg for a Khoja, the kind of food they like.
 Doori doori marts meethan, nishi nishi naabad tyathaan — pepper tastes sweet from afar, sugar tastes bitter when too near.
 Hardas gurus metras, sontah gurus shetras — autumn butter-milk for the friend, and spring butter-milk for the enemy. Consequently, the milk is better in the autumn.
 Hari tang tah zulahnai, muhuri tsont tah zulit — if the pear cost only a cowrie it should not be peeled, but if the apple cost a sovereign it should be peeled. Natives of Kashmir seldom skin a pear, but always skin an apple. Apple-skin, they say, is not easily digested.
 Haruch gugaj tah Laruch gunas chhih barabar — a June turnip and a Lar serpent are equal. A native would not eat June turnip on any account, while Gunas is a round-headed serpent met with principally in Lar parganah, whose bite is generally fatal.
 Majji bhatee — food served by mother is the best food.
  Phata Wangun — a burst eggplant, literally, a sly young man often too clever for his own good.
 Rogan o zafaran az Pampur, sag az Latapur brinj az Nupur; barrah az Nandapur. Puttu o mahi az Sopur; mong az Kralapur. Arad az Khampur. Shir az Shadipur. Angur az Repur — Pampore (the place) for ghee and saffron, Letapur for vegetables. Nipur for rice. Nandapur for lamb. Sopore for pattu and fish. Kralapur for dal. Khampur for flour. Shadipur for milk. And grapes from Repur.
 Talwe peyi na tangah — wishing a pear falls from ceiling is a vain hope.

Food Establishments

Kashmiri restaurants

Ahdoo's first opened its doors as a standalone bakery in 1918. It branched out into a 60-seater restaurant in 1921. Today, it boasts of 120 seats. In the period of militancy in 1995–96, when 99% hotels in Kashmir were shut, it remained open. Ahdoo's has served Bollywood celebrities like Shammi Kapoor, Dilip Kumar, Amitabh Bachchan, Aditya Roy Kapoor, Karan Johar, and Alia Bhatt, amongst others. It bore witness to the bloody days of the Partition and served as a refuge for journalists with non-stop deadlines at any time of the day or night, where they were plied with hot food and tea as a fax machine whirred away in the corner. Haji Mohammad Ibrahim Mugloo brought wazwan to common man by starting Mughal Darbar in 1984. Lahabi Kabab is the specialty of New Zum Zum restaurant in central Srinagar. The dish takes many days to prepare and is soaked in a deep red sauce. Nestled in barbeque street (Khayam Chowk), Imran Cafeteria was established over 50 years ago by Muhammad Yusuf. The road here is often jammed come sundown, as locals and tourists make a beeline to the spot for a taste of smoky meat on skewers. Linz Café first opened in 1975 and for a few decades, this family-run space has firmly established itself in the dietary habits of locals. The restaurant is reportedly built in the shape of a traditional Kashmiri lock. Established in 1976, Alka Salka is recommended by locals for the trout delicacies. Lala Mohammad Sheikh, then a young man from Budgam opened the local go-to for a cup of tea called Lala Sheikh in 1890. The establishment would host everyone from local shopkeepers and students to writers and politicians. In fact, around World War 2, Lala Sheikh would serve soldiers, who would pay in gold. The New York Times shared that the best Kashmiri food in India can be found at Chor Bizarre, New Delhi.

Banquet staffWazas play a key role in Kashmiri society for no celebration of any kind is complete without a banquet. The waza along with his skilled team is hired weeks or months before the occasion. There's a hierarchy among the team of wazas. Given the importance of meat, the crucial task of carving the mutton goes to the head waza, at the other end of the scale, the junior most helper will do chores like pounding dried red chillies with a dash of water.

Butchers

Meat is an important part of Kashmiri culture, a part of their history. Kashmiris relish their delicacies without apology. Meat of different parts is sold at the same price in Kashmir, unlike in western countries. Cutting, dressing and carving of meat is, so to say, an art. Puj in Kashmiri language means a butcher, pujwan is a butcher shop. Use of suitable parts of the animal, cut into pieces of proper size for making different dishes, is desirable.

The following is a table showing the particular parts of sheep or goat used for making various Kashmiri meat dishes:

Famous chefs on Kashmir's food

In India
For celebrity chef Sanjeev Kapoor, Kashmir's food counts as one of the top three exotic foods of India. Chef Ranveer Brar loves Kashmiri tea, in which rose petals were added to give the regular milk tea a pinkish tint. Chef Thomas Zacharias went on a mission to discover unknown culinary gems in Kashmir. At dawn on his first day, he rode out in a shikara to Dal Lake's bustling 150-year-old floating market and came away with boxes of saffron. Thomas sampled local cheeses and foraged greens in the village of Langanbal, an hour's drive from Srinagar. Indian Accent's Manish Mehrotra could follow the main course with Kashmiri haakh saag broth. He understands the rootedness of Kashmiri chilli and the way it is used in everyday cooking. The pioneering food writer Jiggs Kalra at his Delhi restaurant made a dehydrated version of the Kashmiri nadur churma topped with red chilli and served with tangy radish and walnut chutney.

In the UK
Madhur Jaffrey's recipe of deep, rust-coloured Kashmiri roghan josh saved the British from terrible versions of curry cooked at home involving onions, cooking apple, chuck beef and astringent curry powder. English celebrity chef Rick Stein couldn't film the cooking of roghan josh in Kashmir where the dish comes from because of security reasons but in homage to the classic recipe packs it with flavour. 50 Great Curries of India by Camellia Panjabi, the world's best-selling curry book, has the unusual recipe of turnips (gogjee ta maaz) from Kashmir. British celebrity cook and restaurateur, Keith Floyd cooked Kashmiri lamb in milk (aab gosh) which makes for a nice, subtle, pale curry. When twice Michelin-starred chef Vineet Bhatia made a proper rogan josh in London in the early years, customers complained bitterly calling for British curry house capsicum garnish, so he decided to call it slow-cooked Kashmiri shank of lamb and that's when the press started to take notice. British-based chef and television personality Atul Kochhar tends not to use ghee in roghan josh and marinates the meat in spice and yoghurt for a while. Michelin star chef Rohit Ghai's recipe of dum aloo has baby potatoes and Greek yoghurt. Chef Romy Gill is particularly enthralled by the area of Kashmir, and says she was fascinated by the wazwan likening it to the nose to tail movement. She was inspired by the lamb and vegetarian dishes and when she returned to the U.K., made a whole roast chicken using the Kashmiri spices. Chef Cyrus Todiwala OBE loves cumin and Kashmiri chillies.

In the USA
Michelin star chef Vikas Khanna is a huge fan of Kashmiri cuisine. Chef Chintan Pandya of Adda Indian Canteen in Long Island City combines cumin, chili and musky lamb to cook his Kashmiri lamb ribs. Pandya says the inspiration for the dish is a Kashmiri classic called tabak maaz, where the lamb is first cooked in milk and then browned in butter. Guy Fieri featured Kashmiri lamb roghan josh on his TV show Diners, Dive-Ins, and Drives. Anthony Bourdain was hoping to shoot in Kashmir and was excited about visiting but the security situation there was problematic. Food and wine expert Antoni Porowski was shocked by the amount of garlic in traditional Kashmiri dishes, but loves the really thick dhals. Mike Bagale, who, until recently, was the executive chef at Alinea in Chicago, one of America's most sought after dining experience, stopped in Srinagar at a spice shop and could smell the cinnamon as he approached it. At his work station, instead of charcoal, his brazier is filled with cinnamon sticks and the aroma of cinnamon envelops the kitchen.

In Australia
Melbourne-based chef Gary Mehigan, popularly known for his 12-year long stint as a judge on MasterChef Australia found the creatively plated Kashmiri morels with goat's testicles at the Indian restaurant Bombay Canteen interesting.

Contemporary Kashmiri cuisine

Prateek Sadhu, formerly at Masque (Mumbai) is mining his Kashmiri roots to win international fame. His food is characterised by dishes such as lobster roghan josh, roghan josh sausages and raisin-glazed quail served with a yakhni broth. He sourced quince from Kashmir and made an ice-cream with it. Entrepreneur Tariq Ahmad, the 'Pizza Man' of Kashmir, set chicken on roti and sold it to customers in wazwan loving Kashmir. US-based Kashmiri entrepreneur Uffaq Mattu ships chicken patties, harissa bites, shaami kabaab burgers, crumbled tschaman and tamatar pizzas to almost all the 50 states in the US. At her Uffi's Kitchen, French fries were replaced with Nadir Monje, and chicken wings by waaze kokur wings. At Rooh, San Francisco, they make the signature dish of tabakh maaz with Californian Superior Lamb, and French braising techniques. Helly Raichura, chef-founder of EnterViaLaundry in Melbourne has 10-course degustations serving Gujarati khandvi with Kashmiri chilli oil. Noon in Mumbai has kimchi fermented with Kashmiri red chillies. 2019 Masterchef Australia contestant Sandeep Pandit was born in Kashmir, and cooks tamatar gaad (tomato fish) using Australian barramundi.

Sustainable consumption
Kashmiri women would previously take extra mutton dishes by packing them in old newspapers or plastic bags that they would carry. With time, this tradition became popular, and men soon began travelling with the remaining mutton on their traem (wazwan'' copper dish). In Kashmir, taking leftover food into carrying bags evolved into a movement, and people also granted it social legitimacy. Even the elites have joined the cause and begun providing specially made carry bags of leftover food. Even the leftover rice is not wasted in marriage functions and is served to animals (dogs, cattle etc.).

See also 
 Kanger
 List of topics on the land and the people of Jammu and Kashmir
 Wazwan

References

Further reading

 
Indian cuisine by state or union territory
Culture of Azad Kashmir
Culture of Jammu and Kashmir